Zhongli is a railway station on the Taiwan Railways Administration Yilan line. It is located in Wujie Township, Yilan County, Taiwan.

History
The station was opened on 20 July 1936.

Around the station
 Chung Hsing Cultural and Creative Park

See also
 List of railway stations in Taiwan

References

1936 establishments in Taiwan
Railway stations in Yilan County, Taiwan
Railway stations opened in 1936
Railway stations served by Taiwan Railways Administration